Mathrubhumi Yearbook is a concise encyclopedia of current affairs published annually in Malayalam and English by The Mathrubhumi Printing & Publishing Co. Ltd., India.

Mathrubhumi Yearbook Plus English started its publication in 2011. Each year a panel of eminent writers their ideas and views to present articles on topics of importance. The insight of these think tanks makes the book a reference book for aspirants of all competitive examinations. More than twenty of the topics the book dealt with in Yearbook 2013 were featured in Civil Services 2013 exams. Apart from fresh articles and topics, each year the book is updated for the latest facts and figures. All topics that are expected in competitive exams are covered. The facts and figures are collected from authentic sources like government websites, annual reports of various ministries and authentic books. This has added to the credibility of the book.

The yearbook helps students prepare for competitive exams around India.

References 

Indian encyclopedias
Yearbooks
Malayalam encyclopedias
Publications established in 2011
21st-century encyclopedias
21st-century Indian books